Cave is an unincorporated community located in Pendleton County, West Virginia, United States. It was so named because of a cave in the vicinity. A post office was established here in 1890. Cave is located on U.S. Route 220 along the South Branch Potomac River.

References

Unincorporated communities in Pendleton County, West Virginia
Unincorporated communities in West Virginia